Common Chord is an album by American musician David Grisman released in 1993. Blending different genres such as classical music, bluegrass, rock and jazz, this album includes (Jim Kerwin, Enrique Coria, Jerry Garcia, Mark O'Connor), but also classical violin virtuoso, Daniel Kobialka, Grisman's son Monroe on guitar, and many others.

Track listing 
 "Ashokan Farewell" (Jay Ungar) – 5:18
 "Blackberry Turnpike" – 5:01
 "Barbara Allen" (Traditional) – 3:43
 "Dark as a Dungeon" (Merle Travis) – 5:50
 "Eighth of January" – 2:56
 "Midnight on the Water" (Thomasson, Traditional) – 4:17
 "Wayfaring Stranger" (Traditional) – 5:35
 "Maiden's Prayer" (Bob Wills) 3:43
 "The House Carpenter" (Traditional) – 3:53
 "Boston Boy" (Traditional) – 2:39
 "Down in the Willow Garden" (Traditional) – 4:09
 "Omie Wise" (Traditional) – 4:31
 "Ashokan Farewell (Reprise)" (Ungar) – 2:20

Personnel 
 David Grisman – mandolin, guitar
Monroe Grisman – guitar
 Jerry Garcia – guitar, vocals
 Jim Kerwin – bass
 Norton Buffalo – harmonica
 Enrique Coria – guitar
 Daniel Kobialka – violin
 Lisa Kobialka – viola
Rob Ickes – dobro
 Semyon Kobialka – cello
 Edgar Meyer – bass
 Scott Nygaard – guitar
 Tony Trischka – banjo

References 

1993 albums
David Grisman albums